Aemene amnaea is a moth of the family Erebidae. It was described by Charles Swinhoe in 1894. It is found in Assam, India.

References

Cisthenina
Moths described in 1855
Moths of Asia